Andrea Augello (born 24 February 1961) is an Italian politician.

Political career
In 1995 he was elected Regional Councilor of Lazio with about 7,000 votes, within the list of National Alliance; in 2000 he was re-elected with 15,000 votes, and was appointed Regional Assessor for Budget and Community Resources in the government led by Francesco Storace. In 2005 he was re-elected for the third time in the regional council of Lazio with 25,000 votes.

In the 2006 general election he was elected to the Senate of the Republic for National Alliance and re-confirmed in the 2008 general election for The People of Freedom. In March 2010 he was appointed Undersecretary of State of the Ministry of Public Administration and Innovation in the Berlusconi IV Cabinet.

In the 2013 general election he was elected for the third time to the Senate. However, on 16 November 2013, following the dissolution of the People of Freedom, he decided to join the New Centre-Right led by Angelino Alfano.

In 2015 he founded a new political movement, named Cuori Italiani, which merged into Brothers of Italy in 2018.

References

1961 births
Living people
20th-century Italian politicians
21st-century Italian politicians
Italian Social Movement politicians
National Alliance (Italy) politicians
The People of Freedom politicians
New Centre-Right politicians
Identity and Action politicians
Brothers of Italy politicians